A by-election was held in the Cook Islands constituency of Avatiu–Ruatonga–Palmerston on 18 May 2017. The by-election was precipitated by the resignation of Albert Nicholas. It was won by Albert Nicholas.

Background
In the July 2014 general election the contest for Avatiu–Ruatonga–Palmerston (or "RAPPA") saw sitting Cook Islands Party MP John Henry unseated by the Democratic Party challenger Albert Nicholas. Following the election, Nicholas switched his support to the government of Henry Puna in exchange for a position in cabinet. He was subsequently expelled from the Democratic Party. Continued controversy about the ethics of "vaka-jumping" saw him resign his seat in April 2017 in an effort to gain a new mandate.

Nicholas was selected as the Cook Islands Party candidate, a decision which saw former CIP candidate John Henry run as an independent. The Democrats selected Dr Teina Rongo, a former public servant.

The election was won by Albert Nicholas.

Results

References

By-elections in the Cook Islands
Avatiu
Avatiu
Avatiu